Christopher George Charles Nevill, 6th Marquess of Abergavenny,  (born 23 April 1955) is a British peer and current head of the House of Neville. He is the only surviving son of the late Lord Rupert Nevill and his wife Lady Camilla Anne Evelyn Wallop.

Education 
Nevill was educated at Harrow.  He was made Deputy Lieutenant of East Sussex in 2011.

References

1955 births
Living people
People educated at Harrow School
Deputy Lieutenants of East Sussex
21st-century British farmers
21st-century British landowners
Christopher
06